Operation Trident may refer to:
 Operation Trident (1963), a military operation during the Portuguese Colonial War in Guinea in 1964
 Operation Trident (1971), an operation of the Indian Navy that attacked Karachi, Pakistan
 Operation Trident (Metropolitan Police),  a Metropolitan Police Service unit dealing with gun crime in London

See also
 Operation Green Trident
 Trident Conference (1943 Allied Conference)